Ethics is a branch of philosophy that involves systematizing, defending, and recommending concepts of right and wrong conduct.

Ethics may also refer to:
 Ethics (Bonhoeffer book), an unfinished book by Dietrich Bonhoeffer, published in 1949
 Ethics (journal), a quarterly philosophical journal
 Ethics (Spinoza book), a 17th-century book by Baruch Spinoza
 "Ethics" (Star Trek: The Next Generation), a 1992 episode of Star Trek: The Next Generation
 Ethics (Watsuji book), a 1937 book by Tetsuro Watsuji
 Ethics: Origin and Development, a 1921 book by Peter Kropotkin
 Nicomachean Ethics or The Ethics, a work by Aristotle
 Ethics, a 1912 book by G. E. Moore
 ETHICS a methodology for the design and implementation of computer-based information systems devised by Enid Mumford

See also
 Animal ethics, human–animal relationships and how animals ought to be treated
 Applied ethics,  the branch of ethics concerned with the analysis of particular moral issues in private and public life
 Business ethics, ethical principles and moral or ethical problems that can arise in a business environment
 Medical ethics, a system of moral principles that apply values to the practice of clinical medicine and in scientific research